Freiherr Arvid Axel Mardefelt (around 1655 – 18 May 1708) was a Swedish Infantry General from the 18th century and a familiar of Charles XII of Sweden during the Great Northern War.

Biography 
Mardefelt was the son of Field Marshal Conrad Mardefelt. In 1702 during the Great Northern War, he was in charge of the operations of the Swedish Army in Western Poland and in 1704 he conquered Poznań. In 1706 he distinguished himself in the Battle of Fraustadt.

On 29 October 1706 he and his army of 5,000 Swedish and 10,000 Polish Soldiers faced an army of 35,000 Russian, Saxon and Polish troops under August the Strong at the Battle of Kalisz and were defeated. His Polish cavalry under Stanisław Leszczyński Grand Duke of Lithuania, was routed. Mardefelt together with 100 officers, including Polish Magnates, was became a prisoner of war. After his release in 1707, Mardefelt died of gout in Ziönloffkoff, Lithuania.

References

1708 deaths
Swedish Army generals
Swedish nobility
Swedish military personnel of the Great Northern War
Year of birth uncertain
Caroleans